The 2015 NCAA Division I women's volleyball tournament began December 4, 2015 and concluded on December 19 at CenturyLink Center, now known as CHI Health Center, in Omaha, Nebraska. The tournament field was determined on November 29, 2015. Nebraska swept Texas in the final to claim their fourth national championship.

Qualifying teams
The champions of the NCAA's 32 conferences qualified automatically. Twenty-two conferences held tournaments, while the other ten awarded their automatic bid on the basis of being the league's regular-season champion. Those that did not hold tournaments were the American Athletic, Atlantic Coast, Big 12, Big Ten, Big West,  Ivy League, Mountain West, Pac-12, Southeastern and West Coast Conferences. The other 32 bids were apportioned on an at-large basis. Only the top 16 teams overall were seeded.

Records

Bracket
The first two rounds were held on campus sites (the home court of the seeded team, with the exception of Creighton. Due to basketball events already being scheduled in Omaha, the Bluejays had to head to Chapel Hill, North Carolina to play the first and second round.). Regional semifinals and finals were held at pre-determined sites. In 2015, those sites were hosted by the University of Texas at Austin, University of Northern Iowa, University of Kentucky, and University of San Diego. Unlike the NCAA basketball tournament, where teams cannot be placed into regionals that they host, the selectors in the volleyball tournament were required to place qualifying teams in their 'home' regionals, in order to reduce travel costs.

San Diego Regional

Lexington Regional

Austin Regional

Des Moines Regional

Final Four

Final Four All-Tournament Team:
Mikaela Foecke - Nebraska (Most Outstanding Player)
Amber Rolfzen - Nebraska
Justine Wong-Orantes - Nebraska
Kelly Hunter - Nebraska
Amy Neal - Texas
Yaasmeen Bedart-Ghani - Texas
Kelsie Payne - Kansas

Record by conference

The columns R32, S16, E8, F4, CM, and NC respectively stand for the Round of 32, Sweet Sixteen, Elite Eight, Final Four, Championship Match, and National Champion.

Television
All first and second-round games were broadcast on local networks or digital feeds [Longhorn Network (Austin), SEC+ (College Station, Gainesville), BYUtv (Provo), ESPN3 (Chapel Hill, Lawrence, Louisville, College Station- non-SEC, Austin- non-Texas, Gainesville- non-SEC), TheW.tv (Provo- non BYU), P12 Digital feeds (Los Angeles, Stanford, Seattle), and Big Ten Digital (Minneapolis, University Park, Madison, Lincoln]. The Regional Finals onward will all be on ESPN Networks. ESPN3 will carry all the Regional Semis except one game in San Diego which will be shown on ESPNU. ESPNU will carry all the regional finals. ESPN2 will carry the National Semifinals and Final.

Beth Mowins & Karch Kiraly (Austin), & Holly Rowe (Omaha)
Tiffany Greene & Missy Whittemore (Lexington)
Paul Sunderland & Dain Blanton (San Diego)
Cara Capuano & Maria Taylor (Des Moines)

References

NCAA Women's Volleyball Championship
 
Volleyball in Nebraska
NCAA Division I women's volleyball tournament
Sports competitions in Nebraska
NCAA Division I women's volleyball tournament